Carnedd y Filiast is a mountain in Snowdonia, Wales, forming part of the Glyderau. It, along with its top Y Fronllwyd (721 m), forms the most northerly summit in the Glyderau. The average annual temperature on Carnedd y Filiast is estimated to be around 4 Celsius.

The summit is very rocky and has a number of cairns, as it has a vast expanse of layered slab of its crag features, giving rise to some exceptionally long, easy mountain routes, some giving over 1,000 feet of continuous climbing. Many routes are notable for their almost complete lack of protection and total isolation, and the summit affords good views of Anglesey, Snowdon, Carneddau, the Glyderau, Tryfan, Foel Goch, Y Garn and Elidir Fawr, along with Marchlyn Mawr reservoir. The Isle of Man and the Wicklow Mountains in Ireland can be seen on exceptionally clear days.  It is about the 25th highest peak in Snowdonia.

External links 
www.geograph.co.uk : photos of Carnedd y Filiast and surrounding area

References

Hewitts of Wales
Mountains and hills of Snowdonia
Nuttalls
Mountains and hills of Gwynedd
Llanddeiniolen
Llandygai